John Relish (born 5 October 1953) is an English football manager and former player, who previously managed Conference South side Bath City before moving aside to develop a football academy at the club in October 2008. He was also involved in the coaching setup which oversaw Wales win in the non-league Four nations tournament in 2006.

Relish began his playing career as a schoolboy with Liverpool before joining Chester City as an apprentice. He left in 1974 to spend the next thirteen years of his career playing for Newport County, mostly during the most successful period in the club's long history. Relish was part of the team that won promotion and the Welsh Cup and in the subsequent season reached the quarter-final of the 1981 European Cup Winners Cup.

In 1986, with Newport in the midst of a financial crisis that would see the club eventually forced out of existence, Relish took over as manager until Jimmy Mullen took over the role. He continued to play for Newport until 1987 when he left to join Forest Green Rovers. In 1989, he returned to Newport, this time as player-manager of the reformed team and remained in post until 1993, having led Newport to promotion from the Hellenic League.

Management

Relish was assistant manager under Colin Addison at Merthyr Tydfil during Addison's first spell in charge of Merthyr.

He became assistant manager of Weston-super-Mare under his former Newport manager Len Ashurst and took full charge of the club in 1998. He was sacked in October 2001 after an indifferent start to the season.

He returned to Merthyr Tydfil, again as assistant-manager, but now under Andy Beattie in June 2002. He became Merthyr's manager in 2003, but resigned in May 2005 after the playing budget had been cut for the following season.

He was appointed as manager of Bath City the following month, and the following season guided Bath to the Southern League title, and with it promotion to the Conference South. He moved aside to be replaced by his former assistant Adie Britten in October 2008, although remained with the club to work with their community and youth development programme.

Personal
His son Lee, played football for Hereford United, Newport County and Welsh League side Caerleon before retiring through injury. In December 2007, Lee Relish was appointed manager of Cinderford Town.

References

1953 births
Living people
People from Huyton
English footballers
Association football fullbacks
Liverpool F.C. players
Chester City F.C. players
Newport County A.F.C. players
Forest Green Rovers F.C. players
English Football League players
English football managers
Newport County A.F.C. managers
Weston-super-Mare A.F.C. managers
Merthyr Tydfil F.C. managers
Bath City F.C. managers